HD 32515 (HR 1635) is a solitary star located in the southern constellation Caelum. It has an apparent magnitude of 5.9, making it faintly visible to the naked eye under ideal conditions.

HD 32515 has a stellar classification of K2 III, indicating that it is an early K-type giant star. At present it has 152% the Sun's mass and shines at 56.3 times the luminosity of the Sun from its enlarged photosphere at an effective temperature of 4,540 K, giving it an orange glow. HD 32515 has a similar metallicity and age to the Sun and spins slowly with a projected rotational velocity of

References 

Caelum
K-type giants
Durchmusterung objects
1635
032515
Caeli, 26
023446